Belgium began using national postage stamps on July 8, 1849, when two imperforate stamps, a 10c. brown and 20c. blue, collectively known as Epaulettes, were introduced.  A few months later a 40c. red stamp with a new design was issued, for postage to foreign destinations. In 1850 two new stamps of 10c. and 20c. were issued.

Initially, all Belgian stamps were issued with the French name "Belgique" only, as the French was the original language of government. Under the government of Auguste Beernaert, however, stamps began to be issued with the Dutch language "België" too from 1889.

Belgian stamps are rarely issued with German text ("Belgien") too, including overprinted German Germania stamps during World War I.

Gallery

See also
 Inverted Dendermonde
 Jean-Baptiste Moens
 List of people on stamps of Belgium
 Postage stamps and postal history of Ruanda-Urundi

References

External links
Postzegels van Belgie Archive

Communications in Belgium
Philately of Belgium
1849 establishments in Belgium